Class 35 may refer to:

 British Rail Class 35, a class of British diesel locomotive
 DRB Class 35, a class of German passenger locomotives with a 2-6-2 wheel arrangement operated by the Deutsche Reichsbahn which comprised:
 Class 35.0: BBÖ 110
 Class 35.1: BBÖ 329, PKP Class Ol11
 Class 35.1: BBÖ 429.9, ČSD Class 354.7
 Class 35.2: BBÖ 429, ČSD Class 354.7, PKP Class Ol12
 Class 35.3: PKP Class Ol12
 Class 35.4: ČSD Class 354.8
 Class 35.5: ČSD Class 364.0
 Class 35.7: PKP Class Ol103
 Class 35.8: PKP Class Ol12